Pinckard Table is an ice-covered tableland, 8 nautical miles (15 km) long and 3 nautical miles (6 km) wide, rising between the Styx and Burns Glaciers in Victoria Land. Mapped by United States Geological Survey (USGS) from surveys and U.S. Navy air photos, 1955–63. Named by Advisory Committee on Antarctic Names (US-ACAN) for William Pinckard, biologist at McMurdo Station, 1965–66 season.

Plateaus of Antarctica
Landforms of Victoria Land
Borchgrevink Coast